This is a list of people who died (were killed or died in unknown circumstances) as a result of the 2020 Belarusian protests, before, during, and after the 2020 presidential elections:
 Alexander Taraikovsky was shot and died on August 10, 2020, in Minsk. 
 Alexander Vikhor died on August 12, 2020, in Gomel.
 Artsyom Parukou died on August 16, 2020, in Minsk. 
 Konstantin Shishmakov was found dead on August 18, 2020, in Grodno region. 
 Hienadz Shutau was shot by serviceman of the 5th Spetsnaz Brigade of the Armed Forces of Belarus, Captain Roman Gavrilov,  on August 11, 2020, in Brest. He died in a hospital in Minsk on August 19, 2020.
 Raman Bandarenka died in a hospital in Minsk on November 12, 2020.
 Vitold Ashurak died shortly after being imprisoned on May 21, 2021.
 Dmitry Stakhovsky, an 18-year old teenager committed suicide after being investigated for taking part in "mass riots". In his parting text he wrote: "If the moral pressure on me had not continued, I would not have dared to do such a terrible act as suicide. But my strength was running out."
 Andrei Zeltser and a KGB agent were killed in a shootout during a raid of Zeltser's apartment on September 21, 2021.

The authorities and the main persons of the Ministry of Internal Affairs never said that people died at the hands of police representatives.

References

Deaths
2020 protests,deaths
Belarus 2020 protests